Trat Airport,  is an airport in Trat, Thailand. Trat Airport was opened in 2003 and is operated by Bangkok Airways. The airport has one tarmac runway, 1,800 m by 45 m, with a small open-air terminal. The airport has offers customs and immigration services, allowing passengers to check in through to their final destinations without having to do so at Suvarnabhumi Airport.

Bangkok Airways operates daily flights from Bangkok Suvarnabhumi to Trat with ATR-72 equipment.

Airlines and destinations

References

External links

 Picture of Trat Airport
 Trat Airport Guide

Airports in Thailand
Airports established in 2003